Angela Benton (born ) is an American businesswoman. Benton founded NewME (acquired), the first startup accelerator for minorities globally in 2011. She is a pioneer of diversity and one of the most important African-Americans in the technology industry. She has helped minority-led tech companies raise over $47 million in venture capital funding.

Benton has received numerous accolades for her work, including recognition as one of Goldman Sachs’ 100 Most Intriguing Entrepreneurs, Fast Company's Most Influential Women In Technology, and Business Insiders’ 25 Most Influential African-Americans in Technology. Benton has been featured in numerous national and international media outlets including CNN's award-winning documentary series by Soledad O'Brien Black in America: The New Promised Land: Silicon Valley, MSNBC, Bloomberg Television, Inc, Forbes, Good Morning America, and the Wall Street Journal where she was a featured essayist for the paper's 125th Anniversary edition on "The Future of Entrepreneurship".

Career

Black Web 2.0 
Benton launched Black Web 2.0 in August 2007.  It is said that the site was launched out of her frustration to find information on what Blacks were doing in technology both from an entrepreneurial/startup and corporate perspective.  The site quickly gain community amongst Black digerati and early  
adopters, giving them a place to be heard and featured.  Markus Robinson, a partner in the site and its COO until 2010, was a key figure in growing the platform.  In the early days of Black Web 2.0 Benton served as the editor and main writer for the site, along with Robinson, and used the platform to feature and discuss key topics in Black Culture, technology, and where the two intersected.  The duo often critiqued products and the digital strategies of African-American media businesses and forecasted trends in the arena, as such they quickly became the leading experts in the space.

NewME accelerator 
In June 2011 Benton launched the first NewME accelerator cohort in Silicon Valley. Key figures that participated in the program as mentors, speakers, or supporters included some of the technology industry's elite;  Mitch Kapor, Ben Horowitz, Vivek Wadhwa, Google, Twitter, Andreessen Horowitz, Facebook et al. The program was largely responsible for being a catalyst for elevating the conversation around diversity in the technology industry for both ethnic minorities and women. Some alumni of NewME went on to become venture capitalist themselves at Kapor Capital, Andreessen Horowitz, and TEDco. Under her leadership the company helped hundreds of minority companies raise over $47 million in venture capital funding. Benton sold NewME in December 2018.

CNN's Black in America & Silicon Valley's Race Problem 
The NewME Accelerator's inaugural class was featured on CNN's fourth installment of Black in America reported by award-winning journalist Soledad O'Brien.  Benton was featured as one of the primary subjects in the documentary.  The documentary, whose focus was on chronicling the stories of 8 NewME Accelerator participants that traveled to Silicon Valley to work on their startups, catapulted the NewME Accelerator to a national stage and sparked a heated industry debate on the lack of minorities in technology.  At the height of the debate tech maven Michael Arrington, known for off color comments, became a target for out lash on the topic.

Streamlytics 
Benton founded Streamlytics, a next generation data ecosystem that provides ethical, human powered data, in 2018 to democratize data collection. The company is the market leader for an emerging data category, coined community driven data, which places data ownership into the hands of the consumers that create it. Streamlytics has a specific focus on providing data that better reflects the usage of people of color and providing financial compensation for users that opt to share their data. The company’s investors include Issa Rae and The Savannah College of Art and Design.

Other 
Angela Benton is a breast cancer survivor and advocate for health and wellness as it relates to entrepreneurship. She authored REVIVAL in 2017 after her cancer diagnosis.

Influence and Accomplishments
 Fast Company Magazine’s Most Influential Women in Technology, 2010
 Minority Media and Telecommunications Council (MMTC) Hall of Fame, 2010
 National Urban League Woman of Power honoree, 2010
 Ebony Magazine’s Power 150; 2011, 2012
 40 Women of Power under 40, Black Enterprise, 2012
 TheRoot 100: 2010, 2011, 2012
 TheGrio100, 2012
 Digital Vanguard Award, Women Interactive at Spelman University
 Frost & Sullivan Innovator honoree, 2012
 25 Most Influential African-Americans in Technology, Business Insider, 2013
 “100 Most Intriguing Entrepreneurs”, Goldman Sachs, 2013
 The New Guard: 50 Women Who Rule, Marie Claire, November 2013
 Business Insiders’ 46 Most Important African Americans In Technology, April 2014
 Marie Claire’s 20 Women Changing The Ratio, September 2014
 BET, Tech Maven Award, July 2018
 Adweek, 2020 Women Trailblazers, July 2020
 Fast Company, Most Creative People in Business, August 2020
 Inc, Female Founders 100, October 2020

Philanthropy 
Benton traveled to Malawi in 2017 to support local villages with solar powered electricity through a micro fund and partnership established with Kuyere!, a project dedicated to providing solar electricity to the poorest rural households in Africa. Her investment powered 10 villages in Malawi. She produced a documentary series titled, Venture, on her time there.

Filmography

Bibliography 

 Benton, Angela (2017). Revival: How I Rebuilt a Life for Longevity After Cancer, Burnout, and Heartbreak. Angela Benton, Inc.

References

External links

 
Black Web 2.0
streamlytics

1981 births
Living people
American technology company founders
American women company founders
American company founders
21st-century American businesswomen
21st-century American businesspeople
American Internet company founders
African-American people
21st-century African-American women
21st-century African-American people